Anneka Di Lorenzo, later Anneka Vasta (born Marjorie Lee Thoreson; September 6, 1952 – January 4, 2011) was an American exploitation film star and nude model.

Life
Thoreson was born in St. Paul, Minnesota. When her parents divorced in 1965, the teenager ran away to Los Angeles, where she worked as a receptionist, a cocktail waitress, and a topless dancer. During this time she took on various aliases and it was under the name of Priscilla Shutters, while still in her teens, that she was sentenced on such counts as auto theft, possession of a tear-gas gun and passing false checks.

At the age of 17 she appeared nude in Pix ("magazine for men who like action", April 1970) under the name Connie Stodtman. During 1972 she was winning beauty competitions under the names Susan, and then Anneka, Steinberg. Then in 1973 she began modelling for Penthouse under the name Anneka Di Lorenzo, as Pet of the Month in 1973 and Pet of the Year in 1975. Its publisher, Bob Guccione, also gave her a supporting role as Messalina in the film Caligula, which was shot in Rome in 1976. Di Lorenzo performed in several unsimulated sex scenes directed by Guccione, against the wishes of director Tinto Brass. As Caligula spent over two years in post-production, its sets and costumes were used to make the Italian comedy film Messalina, Messalina! (1977) in which Di Lorenzo reprised her role as Messalina, this time as the main female character. Other films in which she made an appearance included the 1974 exploitation films The Centerfold Girls, Mama's Dirty Girls, and Act of Vengeance; later she had a bit part as a nurse in Brian De Palma's Dressed to Kill (1980). However, after Caligula was released in 1979, her participation in the hardcore sex scenes made it difficult for her to find work in mainstream films. She later said that she had consumed drugs and alcohol to get through the scenes. In 1981 she fell out with Guccione and eventually filed a sexual harassment lawsuit against him, alleging that he compelled her to have sex with his business associates. Though she was ultimately awarded $4 million, she lost it on appeal.

Following the end of her glamour career, Di Lorenzo lived out of the limelight, taking various jobs and then training as a yoga instructor. In 2000 she opened a short-lived branch of The Forever Young Experience Inc. under the name Anneka Thoreson, together with Philip Vasta. Later she married Vasta, but her marriage and her future business ventures failed and by 2010 she was living with one of her sisters. In January 2011 she was discovered drowned in the sea off Camp Pendleton in circumstances that indicated either suicide or murder.

See also
List of unsolved deaths

Filmography

References

1952 births
2011 deaths
20th-century American actresses
21st-century American women
Actresses from Saint Paul, Minnesota
American film actresses
Deaths by drowning in California
Female models from Minnesota
Penthouse Pets
People who died at sea
Unsolved deaths in the United States